Xavier Marie Joseph, Duke of Aqutaine (8 September 1753 – 22 February 1754) was a French prince of the House of Bourbon. He was the third surviving child and second eldest son of Louis, Dauphin of France and Maria Josepha of Saxony, and was thus the second oldest brother to the future kings Louis XVI, Louis XVIII and Charles X. He was given the courtesy title of Duke of Aquitaine upon birth and during the five months he lived he was second in line to the throne of France after his elder brother Louis Joseph, Duke of Burgundy. He died after an epileptic seizure and was buried in the Saint Denis Basilica. Since he and his brother predeceased their father and grandfather, the throne of France ultimately passed to their younger brother Louis Auguste.

Ancestors

References

1753 births
1754 deaths
18th-century French people
House of Bourbon
People from Versailles
Princes of France (Bourbon)
Burials at the Basilica of Saint-Denis
Royalty and nobility who died as children